The San Diego State University College of Sciences is the San Diego region's largest center for science education and research. Comprising eight departments and various specialties, the College offers bachelor's, master's and doctoral degrees, as well as curricula for pre-professional students in medicine, veterinary medicine and dentistry. The College strives to produce scientifically educated graduates who possess both a fundamental understanding of their fields and the essential professional skills needed by local and regional industries. The College provides scientific literacy for all San Diego State University graduates as well as participating in the training of future mathematics and science teachers.

Academics

Departments
The College of Sciences includes several academic departments:
 Astronomy
 Biology
 Chemistry & Biochemistry
 Computer Science
 Geological Sciences
 Mathematics & Statistics
 Physics
 Psychology

Institutes and Research Centers
 Donald P. Shiley BioScience Center
 Center for Research in Mathematics and Science Education
 Coastal & Marine Institute Laboratory
 Global Change Research Group
 SDSU Visualization Center

Biological Field Stations
 Field Station Programs
 Santa Margarita Ecological Reserve
 Sky Oaks Field Station
 Fortuna Mountain Research Reserve
 Tijuana River National Estuarine Research Reserve

Biotechnology
 Center for Bio/Pharmaceutical and Biodevice Development
 The Center for Bio/Pharmaceutical and Biodevice Development at San Diego State University provides education and training through distance learning that enhance the professional excellence and career opportunities of scientists in the pharmaceutical, biotechnology and medical device industries#
 Special Programs:
 The SDSU BioScience Center
 Biomedical Quality Systems

Mount Laguna Observatory
 Mount Laguna Observatory
 An astronomical observatory located in the Cleveland National Forest, owned and operated by SDSU
 SDSU is the only institution in the California State University system that offers a complete academic program in Astronomy, including the awarding of graduate degrees.

References

External links

San Diego State University
Astronomy institutes and departments